Seven Swordsmen is a 2006 Chinese television series directed by Clarence Fok and produced by Tsui Hark. The series is loosely adapted from Liang Yusheng's wuxia novels Qijian Xia Tianshan and Saiwai Qixia Zhuan. It is also the television series counterpart to the 2005 film Seven Swords, which was also directed and produced by Tsui Hark. This series was originally planned to be the first season of a longer television series but the project seems to have been abandoned.

Plot
In the mid-17th century, the Manchus conquer the territories of the fallen Ming Empire and establish the Qing Empire. Out of fear that the wulin (martial artists' community) will pose a threat to them, the Qing government forbids the common people from practising martial arts and possessing weapons. Prince Dokado, a Manchu noble, leads an army to eliminate those who defy the order. Dokado and his men kill many martial artists before assaulting Martial Village, which houses rebels from the Red Spears Society, an anti-Qing resistance movement. Two young villagers, Han Zhibang and Wu Yuanying, break out of the siege and follow Fu Qingzhu, a former executioner seeking to redeem himself, to Mount Heaven to seek help from Master Huiming, a reclusive martial artist and sword forger.

Huiming allows his four apprentices – Chu Zhaonan, Yang Yuncong, Xin Longzi and Mulang – to join Fu Qingzhu, Han Zhibang and Wu Yuanying on their quest to save the wulin from the Qing government's persecution. Each of the seven men receives a special sword from Huiming. They call themselves "Seven Swords".

The Seven Swords return in the nick of time and save the villagers from Qing forces attacking them. To avoid Dokado and his troops, the Seven Swords and the villagers flee into the mountains and hide inside a cave system. However, they soon discover that Dokado has planted a spy among them. The spy poisons their water supply, attempts to destroy their escape route, and frames Yang Yuncong for the deed. After escaping from the caves, the Seven Swords agree to split up for one year to avoid trouble. Han Zhibang and Mulang remain with the villagers, while Fu Qingzhu, Xin Longzi and Wu Yuanying go to the imperial capital to assassinate the Qing emperor.

In the meantime, Chu Zhaonan falls into a trap and gets captured by Fenghuo Liancheng, a ruthless Manchu general. He falls in love with Fenghuo Liancheng's slave, Lüzhu, but their romance ends in tragedy when she sacrifices herself to help him escape. Chu Zhaonan slays Fenghuo Liancheng and ventures far into western China, where he encounters Yang Yuncong. The two swordsmen join the Desert Eagles, an anti-Qing tribal group led by the legendary heroine Feihongjin.

During a battle against Qing forces, Yang Yuncong is wounded but is saved and nursed back to health by Nalan Minghui, a Qing general's daughter. They fall in love despite standing on opposing sides, but are not fated to be together as Nalan Minghui's father has arranged for her to marry Dokado. However, Nalan Minghui is already pregnant with Yang Yuncong's child and she gives birth to a baby girl later.

In the imperial capital, Fu Qingzhu, Xin Longzi and Wu Yuanying sneak into the palace and attempt to assassinate the Shunzhi Emperor. They end up saving the emperor from a coup staged by some nobles. In Hangzhou, Han Zhibang becomes the new leader of the Red Spears Society for his heroic actions in rescuing his comrades who were captured by Qing forces.

Following the reunion of the Seven Swords, Chu Zhaonan pretends to defect to the enemy in the hope of finding an opportunity to get close to Dokado and assassinate him. Chu Zhaonan's plan ultimately fails because Dokado sees through his ruse and manipulates him into committing atrocities against his own will. The rebels and the other six swordsmen become increasingly suspicious of where Chu Zhaonan's true allegiance lies.

Eventually, to prove his loyalty, Chu Zhaonan challenges Dokado to a battle on the banks of the Qiantang River and asks the other swordsmen to join him. Although the battle concludes with Dokado's defeat, it also causes the dissolution of the Seven Swords. Yang Yuncong is killed in action; Xin Longzi goes missing after entering a fit of insanity; Mulang returns to Mount Heaven in shame with Yang Yuncong's infant daughter after carelessly allowing the enemy to infiltrate the rebels' hideout; Chu Zhaonan is so deeply traumatised by the devastating experiences he went through that he abandons his fellows along with his conscience. While Fu Qingzhu and Wu Yuanying search for their missing comrades, Han Zhibang stays behind to help the surviving rebels rebuild their forces.

List of episodes

Cast
 Vincent Zhao as Chu Zhaonan, the wielder of the Dragon.
 Wang Xuebing as Yang Yuncong, the wielder of the Transience.
 Ji Chunhua as Xin Longzi, the wielder of the Star Chasers.
 Qiao Zhenyu as Mulang, the wielder of the Sun and Moon.
 Zhang Bo as Han Zhibang, the wielder of the Deity.
 Sang Weilin as Wu Yuanying, the wielder of the Heaven's Fall.
 Yu Chenghui as Fu Qingzhu, the wielder of the Unlearnt.
 Ray Lui as Dokado, a Manchu prince and the primary antagonist in the story.
 Ada Choi as Feihongjin (Flying Red Sash), the leader of the Desert Eagles.
 Li Xiaoran as Nalan Minghui, Nalan Xiuji's daughter and Yang Yuncong's love interest.
 Wang Likun as Liu Yufang, Liu Jingyi's daughter.
 Bryan Leung as Liu Jingyi, the chief of Martial Village.
 Askar Maimaiti as Ai'erjiang, a singer and Feihongjin's ex-lover.
 Sun Feifei as Dong Xiaowan, Mao Pijiang's wife who was forced to be the Shunzhi Emperor's concubine.
 Edell Aidai as Lüzhu (Green Pearl), a slave girl who becomes Chu Zhaonan's first love.
 Eryang as Nalan Xiuji, a Manchu general.
 Xu Xiangdong as Niuhuru, Dokado's mentor.
 Sun Jiankui as Qi Zhenjun, a swordsman hired by Dokado to fight the Seven Swords.
 Tan Kai as Fenghuo Liancheng (Fire Wind Linked Cities), a Manchu general and former baturu.
 Gao Lu as Chuntao, Nalan Minghui's servant.
 Xie Zhenwei as the Shunzhi Emperor, the ruler of the Qing dynasty.
 Dai Chunrong as Empress Dowager Xiaozhuang, the Shunzhi Emperor's mother.
 Kent Tong as Aolong, an ambitious Manchu noble plotting to usurp the throne.
 Guo Hongjie as Zhang Chengbin, Dokado's deputy.
 Liu Tieyong as Zhang Kui, Dokado's deputy.
 Zhang Xin as Qiu Dongluo, a spy planted in Martial Village by Dokado.
 Wang Huarong as Zhang Huazhao, the oldest among the children of Martial Village.
 Ma Ji as Gu Sandao, a member of Martial Village.
 Chen Zhou as Zhang Laifu, a member of Martial Village.
 Zheng Li as Zhou Chaotai, a member of Martial Village.
 Zhou He as Shao Zhanpeng, a member of Martial Village.
 Milading as Ailike, the second-in-command of the Desert Eagles.
 Dilireba'ao as Manlingna, Kelimu's wife.
 Ma Jingwu as Reverend Huiming (Master Shadow Glow), a reclusive swordsman and sword forger.
 Zhu Feng as Mao Pijiang, Dong Xiaowan's husband.
 Wang Xinfen as the White Haired Demoness, Feihongjin's master and Reverend Huiming's ex-lover.
 Yuan Bin as Xinhen (Cruel), one of the "Four Dangers of the Jianghu".
 Huo Yaoliang as Shoula (Ruthless), one of the "Four Dangers of the Jianghu".
 He Qing as Beibi (Despicable), one of the "Four Dangers of the Jianghu".
 Wang Yong as Wuchi (Shameless), one of the "Four Dangers of the Jianghu".

See also
 Seven Swords
 Legend of the White Hair Brides

External links
 
  Seven Swordsmen on Sina.com
 Seven Swordsmen on wu-jing.org

Chinese wuxia television series
Television shows based on works by Liang Yusheng
2006 Chinese television series debuts
2006 Chinese television series endings
Television series set in the Qing dynasty
Mandarin-language television shows
Television shows set in Xinjiang
Television shows set in Hangzhou